Highroad Academy is a private K–12 Christian school located in Chilliwack, British Columbia, Canada. The school was established in 1978.

References

External links
Official website
Highroad Academy Chilliwack British Columbia Academic school ranking. Frasier Institute.

1978 establishments in British Columbia
Education in Chilliwack
Educational institutions established in 1978
Elementary schools in British Columbia
High schools in British Columbia
Middle schools in British Columbia
Nondenominational Christian schools in Canada